Morocco is the northwesternmost country which spans from the Mediterranean Sea and Atlantic Ocean on the north and the west respectively, into large mountainous areas in the interior, to the Sahara desert in the far south. Morocco is a Northern African country, located in the extreme northwest of Africa on the edge of continental Europe. The Strait of Gibraltar separates Spain from Morocco with a  span of water. Morocco borders the North Atlantic Ocean to the west, and the western Mediterranean Sea to the north, and has borders with Algeria and disputed Western Sahara.

The terrain of Morocco is largely mountainous. The Atlas Mountains stretch from the central north to the southwest. To the north of the Atlas Mountains, there are the Rif Mountains, a chain that makes part of the Sierra Nevada mountain range in Andalusia, Spain.

These vast plains promotes fertile agricultural lands and support 15% of the local economy.

In the extreme southeast of the country, the lands are arid due to their proximity to the Sahara Desert. Palm trees oasis are developed in many regions, notably in Figuig and Zagora.

Geography statistics
Coordinates:

Area:
total:
446,550 km² (excluding Western Sahara), 712,550 km² (Morocco and Western Sahara combined)
land:
446,302 km² (or 712,200 km²)
water:
250 km²

Area – comparative:
Morocco without Western Sahara is slightly larger than California; slightly larger than Newfoundland and Labrador; slightly more than half the size of New South Wales province of Australia; slightly less than twice the size of the United Kingdom.

Morocco and Western Sahara combined are slightly larger than Texas.

Land boundaries:
total:
2,018.9 km
border countries:
Algeria 1 559 km, Free Zone (de facto border along the Moroccan Western Sahara Wall) 2200 km, Spain (Ceuta) 6.3 km, Spain (Melilla) 9.6 km

Coastline:
1835 km

2945 km (including the coast of Western Sahara)

Maritime claims:
Territorial sea:

Contiguous zone:

Exclusive economic zone:
 with 
Continental shelf:
200-m depth or to the depth of exploitation

Climate

Morocco's climate can be divided into two parts: The northwest and the southeast. 
In the southeast, the climate is arid and poorly populated. The northwest has a mild climate, and 95% of the Moroccan population lives in these regions..

The largely populated areas of the northwest of the country mostly have a Mediterranean climate, but since the country is heavily mountainous, continental and alpine influence is evident, as well as the oceanic influence along the Atlantic coastline. And finally, the semi-arid lands, that cover few regions in the northeast, the central-south, and the southwest.

Along the Mediterranean coast, the climate is typically Mediterranean and supports all types of typical Mediterranean vegetation. The summers are moderately hot and the winters are mild. Further away from the coast, into the Rif Mountain range, the climate starts to become more continental in character, with colder winters and hotter summers. At elevations above , the climate is alpine with warm summers and cold winters. Rainfall is much higher on the west side than it is on the east side. Snow is abundant at higher elevations.

 Typical Mediterranean climate cities: Tangier, Tétouan, Al Hoceima, Nador
 Typical continental-influenced cities: Chefchaouen, Issaguen, Targuist, Taza
 Typical alpine-influenced cities: Bab Berred

Along the Atlantic coast, the climate is the Mediterranean with oceanic influence. The imprint of the oceanic climate differs along the coastline from region to region. It is generally presented from Asilah to Essaouira. The summers are warm to moderately hot, and winters are cooler than on the Mediterranean coast. Further away from the coastal lands, into the Atlas Mountain range, the climate starts to become more continental in character, with colder winters and hotter summers. At elevations above , the climate is typically alpine, with warm summers and cold winters. Rainfall is generally high. Snow is abundant at higher elevations. There are two ski stations, one in the middle-Atlas Mischliffen, and the other in the High-Atlas Oukaïmeden.

 Typical oceanic-influenced cities: Rabat, Casablanca, Essaouira, Larache
 Typical continental-influenced cities: Fès, Meknès, Khenifra, Beni Mellal
 Typical alpine-influenced cities: Ifrane, Azrou, Midelt, Imouzzer Kandar

The southern regions of the northwest are semi-arid. Rainfall is lower, and is between  annually. Although temperature ranges generally do not change in comparison with the upper provinces, a slight increase in high averages is not to be dismissed. Largely due to the lower latitudes where they fall.

Typical cities with such climate are Agadir and Marrakesh.

The disputed Western Sahara region features a hot desert climate, but temperatures are more moderate along the coast.

Climate change 

As of 2020, Morocco has been hit with unseasonal heatwaves

Physical geography

The northern coast and interior are mountainous with large areas of bordering plateaus, intermontane valleys, and rich coastal plains. The northern mountains are geologically unstable and subject to earthquakes.

Morocco occupies a strategic location along the Strait of Gibraltar, the waterway connecting the Mediterranean Sea and Atlantic Ocean.

Elevation extremes:
Lowest point:
Sebkha Tah −55 m
Highest point:
Toubkal mountain 4,165 m

Longest river: Draa River (1,100 km)

Land use and natural resources
Natural resources:
Phosphates, Iron ore, Manganese, Lead, Zinc, Fish, Salt

Land use:
Arable land:
17.5%
Permanent crops:
2.9%
Permanent pastures:
47.1%
Forests:
11.5%
Other:
21.61% (2011)

Irrigated land:
14,850 km² (2004)

Total renewable water resources:
29 km3 (2011)

Natural hazards:
periodic droughts

Environment

Ecoregions

Mediterranean forests, woodlands, and scrub
 Mediterranean dry woodlands and steppe
 Mediterranean woodlands and forests
 Mediterranean Acacia-Argania dry woodlands and succulent thickets

Temperate coniferous forests
 Mediterranean conifer and mixed forests

Montane grasslands and shrublands
 Mediterranean High Atlas juniper steppe

Deserts and xeric shrublands
 North Saharan steppe and woodlands

Freshwater ecoregions
 Permanent Maghreb
 Temporary Maghreb

Marine ecoregions
 Alboran Sea
 Saharan Upwelling

Current environmental issues
Land degradation/desertification (soil erosion resulting from farming of marginal areas, overgrazing, destruction of vegetation); water supplies contaminated by raw sewage; siltation of reservoirs; oil pollution of coastal waters.

International environmental agreements
Morocco is party to:
Biodiversity, Climate Change, Climate Change-Kyoto Protocol, Desertification, Endangered Species, Hazardous Wastes, Law of the Sea, Marine Dumping, Ozone Layer Protection, Ship Pollution (MARPOL 73/78), Wetlands, Whaling
signed, but not ratified:
Environmental Modification

Extreme points 

This is a list of the extreme points of Morocco, the points that are farther north, east or west than any other location, excluding the disputed Western Sahara area.
 Northernmost point – Pointe Leona, Tanger-Tetouan-Al Hoceima region
 Easternmost point – unnamed point on the border with Algeria immediately east of the town of Iche, Oriental region
 Westernmost point –  the point at which the border with Western Sahara enters the Atlantic Ocean, Guelmim-Oued Noun region
 Note: Morocco does not have a southernmost point, its southern border with Western Sahara following latitude 27° 40′ north.

See also
 Climate of Morocco
 List of rivers of Morocco

Notes

References

External links

 European Digital Archive on the Soil Maps of the world Soil Maps of Morocco
 CIA Factbook: Morocco

 
Climate change in Morocco